Julia Aide Shumate Avila (born May 11, 1988) is an American mixed martial artist currently signed to the Ultimate Fighting Championship (UFC). Previously she has competed in Invicta FC, HD MMA, XKO MMA, Total Warrior Combat and King of the Cage (KOTC). As of March 7, 2023, she is #12 in the UFC women's bantamweight rankings.

Background
Of Mexican descent, Avila was born  in Los Angeles, California. Julia graduated from South High School, where she was a sports standout and a member of varsity team in volleyball, soccer and track and field. She attended The University of Notre Dame, graduated 2010 from University of California, Santa Cruz, and is currently a geologist in Oklahoma City. She began training martial arts in 2011 after graduating from college.

Mixed martial arts career
Avila has notable wins over former UFC flyweight champion Nicco Montaño and Marion Reneau.

Ultimate Fighting Championship
On March 22, 2019, Avila was signed to the UFC's women's bantamweight division. Avila was originally scheduled to face Melissa Gatto on July 6, 2019, at UFC 239. Gatto was dropped from the card due to undisclosed reasons and was replaced by Pannie Kianzad. Avila won the fight via unanimous decision.

Avila was expected to face Karol Rosa on October 26, 2019, at UFC Fight Night: Maia vs. Askren. The fight was later cancelled due to a knee injury from Rosa. The match was rescheduled to April 11, 2020, at UFC Fight Night: Overeem vs. Harris. Due to the COVID-19 pandemic, the event was eventually postponed. The pair was rescheduled to meet on May 2, 2020, at UFC Fight Night 174. However, on April 9, Dana White, the president of UFC announced that the event too was postponed to June 13, 2020. Instead, Avila faced Gina Mazany, replacing Rosa, on June 13, 2020, at UFC on ESPN: Eye vs. Calvillo. She won the bout via first-round technical knockout just 22 seconds into the fight.

Avila was scheduled to face Nicco Montaño on August 8, 2020, at UFC Fight Night 176. However, due to Montano's coach John Wood testing positive for COVID-19, the bout was reschedule to UFC Fight Night 177. However, Montaño tested positive for COVID-19 and the bout was moved to UFC Fight Night: Holm vs. Aldana. Subsequently, on September 3, it was announced that Montaño withdrew from the bout due to travel restrictions. After negotiating a new contract with the UFC, Avila faced Sijara Eubanks on September 12, 2020, at UFC Fight Night 177. She lost the fight via unanimous decision.

Avila was expected to face Julija Stoliarenko at UFC on ESPN 21 on March 20, 2021. However at the weigh ins, Stoliarenko suffered a syncopal episode on the scale and the fight was scrapped.  The pair was rescheduled and took place at UFC Fight Night 190. Avila won the fight via a rear-naked choke in round three.

Avila was scheduled to face Raquel Pennington on December 18, 2021, at UFC Fight Night 199. However, Avila was forced to pull from the event due to injury. She was replaced by Macy Chiasson.

Personal life
In October 2022, Avila and her husband welcomed their first child, a daughter, to the world.

Championships and accomplishments
Invicta FC
Performance of the Night (one time) vs. Alexa Conners
HD MMA
HD MMA Bantamweight Championship (one time; former)

Mixed martial arts record

|Win
|align=center|9–2
|Julija Stoliarenko
|Submission (rear-naked choke)
|UFC Fight Night: Gane vs. Volkov
|
|align=center|3
|align=center|4:19
|Las Vegas, Nevada, United States
|
|-
|Loss
|align=center|8–2
|Sijara Eubanks
|Decision (unanimous)
|UFC Fight Night: Waterson vs. Hill
|
|align=center|3
|align=center|5:00
|Las Vegas, Nevada, United States
|
|-
|Win
|align=center| 8–1
|Gina Mazany
|TKO (punches)
|UFC on ESPN: Eye vs. Calvillo
|
|align=center|1
|align=center|0:22
|Las Vegas, Nevada, United States
|
|- 
|Win
|align=center| 7–1
|Pannie Kianzad
|Decision (unanimous)
|UFC 239 
|
|align=center|3
|align=center|5:00
|Las Vegas, Nevada, United States
|
|-
|Win
|align=center | 6–1
|Alexa Conners
|TKO (front kick and punches)
|Invicta FC 32: Spencer vs. Sorenson
|
|align=center | 2
|align=center | 4:43
|Shawnee, Oklahoma, United States
|
|-
| Win
| align=center | 5–1
| Ashley Deen
| KO (punches)
| HD MMA 13: Avila vs Deen
| 
| align=center | 1
| align=center | 2:08
| Shawnee, Oklahoma, United States
|
|-
|Loss
|align=center|4–1
|Marciea Allen
|TKO (hand injury)
|Invicta FC 29: Kaufman vs. Lehner
|
|align=center|1
|align=center|0:49
|Kansas City, Missouri, United States
|
|-
|Win
|align=center | 4–0
|Candace Maricle
|Submission (armbar)
|HD MMA 9
|
|align=center | 1
|align=center | 1:18
|Oklahoma City, Oklahoma, United States
|
|-
|Win
|align=center | 3–0
|Nicco Montaño
|Decision (unanimous)
|HD MMA 7
|
|align=center| 5
|align=center| 5:00
|Oklahoma City, Oklahoma, United States
|
|-
|Win
|align=center | 2–0
|Carolyn Biskup-Roe
|TKO (punches)
|XKO 32
|
|align=center| 1
|align=center| 1:28
|Dallas, Texas, United States
|
|-
|Win
|align=center | 1–0
|Marion Reneau
|Decision (unanimous)
|TWC 13: Impact
|
|align=center| 3
|align=center| 5:00
|Porterville, California, United States
|
|-

See also
 List of current UFC fighters
 List of female mixed martial artists

References

External links
  
 

1988 births
Living people
Mixed martial artists from Oklahoma
Bantamweight mixed martial artists
Mixed martial artists utilizing Brazilian jiu-jitsu
American practitioners of Brazilian jiu-jitsu
Female Brazilian jiu-jitsu practitioners
American female mixed martial artists
Ultimate Fighting Championship female fighters
American mixed martial artists of Mexican descent
21st-century American women